This is a list of all the players who have captained the Ukraine national football team.

Yuriy Shelepnytskyi was the first captain of the Ukraine national football team.

Andriy Shevchenko wore the captain band the most times: 58.

Andriy Yarmolenko is the current captain of the national team.

List of captains

List of captaincy periods of the various captains throughout the years.

Players in bold are still active. Years in italics indicate last year, when still an active player was a captain.

Notes

References

Captain
Ukraine captains
Association football player non-biographical articles